K2 Snowboards are snowboards manufactured by the sports equipment company K2 Sports. K2 Sports was founded by businessman Bill Kirschner in 1962. The company manufactured some of the first sets of fibreglass skis in the 1960s, and delivered its first lot of 250 pairs of fibreglass skis in 1964.

In 1976, the company was acquired by investment company, Sitca. In 1985, it was acquired by Anthony Industries. By 1988, the demand for snowboards was high, and by 1994, in a new factory, K2 had produced its own line of snowboards.

K2 became one of the top 5 manufacturers of snowboards in the United States, and it has sponsored a number of professional snowboarders including Gretchen Bleiler.

K2 History

After World War II, Bill Kirschner, the founder of K2 Sports, started manufacturing splints and animal cages. They were the leading manufacturer of research cages.

In 1961, Kirchner followed the pattern of a borrowed ski to make his first pair of fiberglass skis. He then partnered with the Seattle-based ski distributor, Anderson & Thompson Ski Company to take his dream to the next level. In 1964, Kirschner delivered his first set of skis at 250 pairs. The next year, it grew to 1,600. By 1968, K2 Sports separated from Anderson & Thompson to start its own distribution and marketing. With excellent product and decision, sales boomed, and by 1976, the company was sold to a private group of investors called Sitca.

By 1985, Anthony Industries, Inc. acquired 100 percent of the stock of Sitca. Anthony Industries is a Los Angeles Based company that allowed K2 to expand in its facilities. By 1988, snowboarding had a boom in popularity. In 1994, with the help of an expanded factory in Washington, K2 manufactured an award-winning line.

K2 Sponsored Riders

References

External links

 K2 Corporation (K2 Sports) -- a History at HistoryLink

Snowboarding companies
Sporting goods manufacturers of the United States
Manufacturing companies based in Seattle

es:K2 Snowboards
fi:K2